Richard Amorim Falcão (born 29 June 1987), sometimes known as Rei is a Brazilian professional footballer who plays as a forward for Real Noroeste.

Career

Early career
Born in Feira de Santana he played with Botafogo, America RJ, Paraíba do Sul and Colatinense.

Thailand
In 2009, he moved to Thailand and played with top-league side Buriram United, at time known as Provincial Electricity Authority FC which had just been Thai Premier League champions the season earlier, 2008.

Back in Brazil
After returning from Thailand, on January 3, 2010, he signed with Guarani (Campeonato Paulista A2), Then he joined Ponte Preta and played in the Campeonato Brasileiro Serie B but he disappointed after missing a goal in an important match against Nautico and ended up leaving in March 2011.  He then played with Veranópolis in the Campeonato Gaucho. On January 3, 2012, he signed with Itabuna and played in the Campeonato Baiano. Later he played with América PE (Campeonato Pernambucano), Rio Claro (Campeonato Paulista A2), Villa Nova, Esportiva Patrocinense and Ipatinga (Campeonato Brasileiro Serie C), In July 2013 he signed with Comercial after a brief spell with Betim Amadense, Galícia (Campeonato Baiano) and Jacobina were his last clubs before his move to Europe.

Serbia
In the winter break of the 2014–15 Serbian SuperLiga season, he joined FK Novi Pazar.

He left Serbia at the end of the first half of the season, and during winter-break he returned to Brazil. He joined Jacuipense but stayed only during the month of January, afterwards moving to Juazeirense. Next he played with Atlético Itapemirim, Vitória das Tabocas and Real Noroeste.

Honours
Campinas
 Campeonato Brasileiro Serie B: 2008

References

External links
 richardfalcao9.blogspot.pt
 

1987 births
Living people
Brazilian footballers
Association football forwards
Botafogo de Futebol e Regatas players
America Football Club (RJ) players
Clube Atlético Colatinense players
Richard Falcao
Guarani FC players
Associação Atlética Ponte Preta players
Veranópolis Esporte Clube Recreativo e Cultural players
América Futebol Clube (PE) players
Rio Claro Futebol Clube players
Villa Nova Atlético Clube players
Ipatinga Futebol Clube players
Comercial Futebol Clube (Ribeirão Preto) players
Galícia Esporte Clube players
FK Novi Pazar players
Richard Falcao
Campeonato Brasileiro Série A players
Serbian SuperLiga players
Brazilian expatriate sportspeople in Thailand
Brazilian expatriates in Serbia
Expatriate footballers in Thailand
Expatriate footballers in Serbia